White River Provincial Park is a provincial park in British Columbia, Canada. It is located 27 km south of Sayward on Vancouver Island.

Recreation
Fishing and hiking is available within park boundaries. A short loop-trail to the White River allows viewing of giant old-growth Douglas Fir and Western Red Cedar trees. This area has apparently been referred to as the Cathedral Grove of northern Vancouver Island. Kelsey Bay Division (MacMillan Bloedel Ltd) fallers refused to fall this area in 1990 and it was left. This did not happen very often.

References

External links
 BC Parks - White River Provincial Park

Northern Vancouver Island
Provincial parks of British Columbia